Palana may refer to:

 Palana, Bikaner, India
 Palana, Kheda, India
 Palana, Russia